The 1950 Women's Western Open was a golf competition held at Cherry Hills Country Club, the 21st edition of the event. Babe Zaharias won the championship in match play competition by defeating Peggy Kirk in the final match, 5 and 3.

Women's Western Open
Golf in Colorado
Women's Western Open
Women's Western Open
Women's Western Open
Women's sports in Colorado